Moreno is a genus of South American long-spinneret ground spiders that was first described by Cândido Firmino de Mello-Leitão in 1940.

Species
 it contains six species, found only in Argentina and Chile:
Moreno chacabuco Platnick, Shadab & Sorkin, 2005 – Chile
Moreno chivato Platnick, Shadab & Sorkin, 2005 – Chile
Moreno grande Platnick, Shadab & Sorkin, 2005 – Chile
Moreno morenoi Mello-Leitão, 1940 (type) – Argentina
Moreno neuquen Platnick, Shadab & Sorkin, 2005 – Argentina
Moreno ramirezi Platnick, Shadab & Sorkin, 2005 – Argentina

See also
 List of Prodidominae species

References

Araneomorphae genera
Prodidominae
Taxa named by Cândido Firmino de Mello-Leitão